Stand Ye Guamanians, officially known as the Guam Hymn, is the regional anthem of Guam. The original English lyrics and music were written and composed in 1919 by Ramon Manilisay Sablan. The lyrics were slightly modified by the U.S. government prior to official adoption in 1952. In 1974, Lagrimas Untalan translated the English lyrics into CHamoru, which were made official in 1989. The CHamoru version is more widely used today.

As a United States dependency, the official national anthem is still the "Star Spangled Banner", which is always played before the Guam Hymn on official occasions. The Guam Hymn, however, is played alone at international sports competitions.

History
The song was originally written in English and composed in 1919 by Ramon Manilisay Sablan (1901/02–1970), the first CHamoru medical doctor and a CHamoru rights activist. Sablan, who attended Oklahoma State College, was also a classically trained accomplished pianist and oboe player who also sat in the college orchestra's first violin section. He received his medical degree from the University of Louisville School of Medicine in Kentucky.

A February 1934 article in the Guam Recorder noted that the song had been sung customarily "for some years" during daily flag exercises in schools, alternating each day alongside another composition beginning with the line "All Hail to thee, our noble flag".

After World War II, the U.S. government modified the lyrics of the song, such as changing the word "Chamorros" to "Guamanians" in the first line, before officially adopting it as the territorial anthem of Guam on 2 May 1952. Despite this, the song practically disappeared from public consciousness and was no longer regularly sung by children as it had been prior to the war. However, at the turn of the 1970s, a noticeable decline in the transmission of the CHamoru language to children led to the song gaining more attention once again.

On 31 January 1989, the CHamoru lyrics were made official. On 27 November 1991, it was made law for students to sing the anthem in CHamoru at school.

Lyrics

Notes

References

Guamanian culture
Anthems of insular areas of the United States
Oceanian anthems